The 1973 New York Mets season was the 12th regular season for the Mets, who played home games at Shea Stadium. Manager Yogi Berra led the team to a National League East title with an 82–79 record and the National League pennant, though they were defeated by the Oakland Athletics in the World Series. Their .509 winning percentage is the lowest of any pennant-winner in major league history. Having won only 82 games during the regular season, they, along with the 2005 San Diego Padres, qualified for the postseason with the fewest regular season wins since Major League Baseball expanded to a 162-game season in 1961, and the fewest of any team since 1885 (excluding the strike-shortened 1981 season and the 2020 season shortened by the COVID-19 pandemic). The season was well known for pitcher Tug McGraw's catchphrase "Ya Gotta Believe!!!"

Offseason 
 November 1, 1972: Danny Frisella and Gary Gentry were traded by the Mets to the Atlanta Braves for Félix Millán and George Stone.
 November 27, 1972: Brent Strom and Bob Rauch were traded by the Mets to the Cleveland Indians for Phil Hennigan.
 November 27, 1972: Tommie Agee was traded by the Mets to the Houston Astros for Rich Chiles and Buddy Harris.
 November 30, 1972: Dave Marshall was traded by the Mets to the San Diego Padres for Al Severinsen.
 March 28, 1973: Bill Sudakis was traded by the Mets to the Texas Rangers for Bill McNulty.

Regular season

Season highlights

Initial turmoil 
The 1973 Mets were much improved from their "miracle" 1969 team. They had a group of young proven stars—including Jon Matlack, Rusty Staub, John Milner, and Félix Millán—mixed in with veterans from the 1969 club, such as Jerry Grote, Cleon Jones, Wayne Garrett, and Bud Harrelson. Their pitching staff, led by Tom Seaver, was among the finest in baseball. But injuries hampered the Mets throughout the entire season.

The Mets got off to a 4–0 start to the season, and were still at first place by April 29 with a 12–8 record.  But then, injuries to their key players caused turmoil. By July 26, the Mets were in last place, yet still only  games behind. On August 16, they were 12 games below .500, with 44 games to play.

On August 30, the Mets were in last place, with only a month left to play. However, the division was so tight-knit that the last place standing consisted of only a  game deficit. At the completion of August (one day later), the Mets were in fifth place, nine games under .500, but, in the balanced mediocrity of that year's Eastern Division, just  games out of first. The mathematical inequities of divisional play were beginning to show up. On September 11, the Mets were in fourth place, five games under .500, but just three games out. Ahead of them were the St. Louis Cardinals, Pittsburgh Pirates, and Montreal Expos.

"You Gotta Believe!!!" 
With Tug McGraw urging his teammates on and celebrating victories with what soon became the catch phrase of 1973, "You Gotta Believe!!!" the Mets kept zigging and zagging away from would-be tacklers, and taking an occasional side-swipe, headed for this most unlikely of pennants. Down the stretch, Yogi Berra, veteran of many a pennant race, ran four starters at the league: Tom Seaver, Jerry Koosman, Jon Matlack, and George Stone, with the suddenly unhittable McGraw coming out of the pen with boisterous - and justified - confidence. (For his last 19 games, the screwball-throwing lefty showed 12 saves, 5 wins, and an ERA of 0.88).

The unexpected clincher 
After sweeping a three-game series from the Pirates at Shea on September 21, the Mets' record stood at an even 77–77, but that .500 record was good enough for first place and a half-game lead. Illustrating just how dense the crowd was at the top, fifth-place Chicago was just  out. The Mets won five of their last seven to finish as National League East Division Champions. The clinching took place at Wrigley Field on October 1 as the Mets beat the Cubs 6-4 as Tom Seaver won his 19th game of 1973 and Tug McGraw made the save.

This was the only NL East title between 1970 and 1980 not to be won by either the Philadelphia Phillies or the Pittsburgh Pirates.

Season standings

Record vs. opponents

Opening Day starters 
 Duffy Dyer
 Jim Fregosi
 Bud Harrelson
 Cleon Jones
 Willie Mays
 Félix Millán
 John Milner
 Tom Seaver
 Rusty Staub

Notable transactions 
 June 5, 1973: Lee Mazzilli was drafted by the Mets in the 1st round (14th pick) of the 1973 Major League Baseball Draft.
 July 11, 1973: Jim Fregosi was sold by the Mets to the Texas Rangers.

Roster

Player stats

Batting

Starters by position 
Note: Pos = Position; G = Games played; AB = At bats; H = Hits; Avg. = Batting average; HR = Home runs; RBI = Runs batted in

Other batters 
Note: G = Games played; AB = At bats; H = Hits; Avg. = Batting average; HR = Home runs; RBI = Runs batted in

Pitching

Starting pitchers 
Note: G = Games pitched; IP = Innings pitched; W = Wins; L = Losses; ERA = Earned run average; SO = Strikeouts

Other pitchers 
Note: G = Games pitched; IP = Innings pitched; W = Wins; L = Losses; ERA = Earned run average; SO = Strikeouts

Relief pitchers 
Note: G = Games pitched; W = Wins; L = Losses; SV = Saves; ERA = Earned run average; SO = Strikeouts

Postseason

NLCS

Game 1 
October 6: Riverfront Stadium, Cincinnati

Game 2 
October 7: Riverfront Stadium, Cincinnati

Game 3 
October 8: Shea Stadium, New York City

Game 4 
October 9: Shea Stadium, New York City

Game 5 
October 10: Shea Stadium, New York City

World Series

Awards and honors 
 Cy Young Award – Tom Seaver
 Jerry Koosman – Player of the Month, April 1973

All-Stars 
All-Star Game
 Tom Seaver
 Willie Mays

Farm system 

LEAGUE CHAMPIONS: Memphis

Notes

References 

1973 New York Mets at Baseball Reference
1973 New York Mets team page at www.baseball-almanac.com

External links 

New York Mets seasons
New York Mets season
National League East champion seasons
National League champion seasons
New York
1970s in Queens